Hugh Johnston Anderson (May 10, 1801 – May 31, 1881) was member of the United States Congress from Maine and served as the 20th Governor of Maine.

Early life
Hugh J. Anderson was born in Wiscasset (in modern-day Maine, then a part of Massachusetts) on May 10, 1801.  He attended the local schools, moved to Belfast, Maine in 1815, and was employed as a clerk in his uncle's mercantile business.

Political career

In 1827 Anderson was elected clerk of courts for Waldo County. A Democrat, Anderson was elected to the Twenty-fifth and Twenty-sixth Congresses, serving from March 4, 1837 to March 3, 1841. He was not a candidate for reelection to the Twenty-seventh Congress in 1840. From 1844 to 1847 Anderson was the Governor of Maine. He was a candidate for U.S. Senator in 1847 but subsequently withdrew and moved to Washington D.C., where he served as commissioner of customs in the United States Treasury Department 1853-1858; appointed head of the commission to reorganize and adjust the affairs of the United States Mint at San Francisco, Calif., in 1857; returned to Washington 1859. Sixth Auditor of the Treasury 1866-1869; retired from public life in 1880 and returned to Portland, Maine where he died May 31, 1881.

Family

His father, John Anderson, was a native of County Down, Ireland; and his grandfather, also John Anderson was a prominent and influential member of the Scottish Protestant colony in that part of [Ireland. His father immigrated to Maine 1789.

Anderson married Martha J. Drummer of Belfast, Maine, in 1832.

The couple had six children:

John F. Anderson, officer in the Union Army during the American Civil War, attained the rank of brigadier general by brevet.
Hannah Anderson (no records of marriage found).
William H. Anderson
Joseph Anderson
Horace Anderson  (Age 10 in the 1850 census of Belfast, Maine.)
Thomas Anderson

He lost two sons before he died, and his wife followed him several months after his death. Interment in Grove Cemetery, Belfast, Maine.

References

External links

 

1801 births
1881 deaths
Maine lawyers
Democratic Party governors of Maine
United States Department of the Treasury officials
People from Wiscasset, Maine
People from Belfast, Maine
County officials in Maine
Democratic Party members of the United States House of Representatives from Maine
Burials in Maine
19th-century American politicians
19th-century American lawyers